Charles Wesley Lyon (September 13, 1887 – July 20, 1960) was an American attorney from California who served as a Republican in the California State Assembly and the California State Senate. Lyon was Assembly Speaker from 1943 to 1946. Lyon was admitted to the bar in 1910 and was first elected to the Assembly in 1914. Lyon served numerous terms in the Senate and Assembly and authored the legislation creating the UCLA campus.

Early life and career; fraternal activities
Lyon was born in Los Angeles on September 13, 1887. He was the eighth of nine children of James H. and Laura Emma (Simpson) Lyon, who had moved to California from Maine. The family was distantly related to John Alden and to Henry Wadsworth Longfellow. James Lyon was a carpenter foreman and architect. Charles attended the public schools in Los Angeles and San Francisco, then studied law at night while working for the Title Insurance and Trust Company in Los Angeles; he had begun working for the company at the age of fifteen. He was admitted to the California Bar at the age of 23 in 1910. He then went into private practice as a member of the firm of Fredericks & Hanna. He married Nancy Janney, daughter of a well known Utah mining engineer on September 21, 1912, and the couple had three children.

At age 21, Lyon was elected president of Los Angeles Parlor No. 45 of the Native Sons of the Golden West. Lyon became state president of the California State Aerie of the Fraternal Order of Eagles, which then had over thirty thousand members in California. In 1919, he was elected exalted ruler for 1919–20 of Santa Monica Elks Lodge.

Political career
In 1914, Lyon became City Attorney of Venice, California, where he and his family were living as of 1921. Later that year, Lyon was elected to the California State Assembly as a Republican, and was reelected in 1916. While in the Assembly, he opposed the Populist reforms being enacted at that time. In 1918, he ran for the State Senate, and was elected. He remained in the Senate until defeated for re-election in 1930.

After two years out of office, Lyon ran for and was elected to the Assembly again, and served there until 1946. In the Assembly, he feared that Governor Frank Merriam would move to the left in response to the Depression, and actively opposed Merriam's Democratic successor, Culbert Olson.

While Lyon's 1938 re-election did not get any especial note at the time, it is remembered today because of the later careers of the opponents whom he defeated. Lyon cross-filed, running in both the Republican and Democratic primaries, and secured his re-election by defeating future Richard Nixon campaign manager Murray Chotiner in the Republican poll, and narrowly beating Robert A. Heinlein (who subsequently turned to writing science fiction) in the Democratic contest. Heinlein's political short story, "A Bathroom of Her Own" is based on Heinlein's own political experiences in the race against Lyon.

In 1939, Lyon became Assembly minority leader. The following year, during the special session, Republicans and conservative Democrats formed a ruling coalition, and Lyon became Chairman of the Rules Committee. The Republicans won a majority in the Assembly in 1942, and Lyon was elected Speaker the following year, a post he held for two terms. By this time, Republican Earl Warren had defeated Olson for reelection, and Lyon cooperated with Warren on such issues as postwar planning. In 1946, Lyon ran unsuccessfully for the position of Lieutenant Governor of California. In 1950, he recaptured a seat in the Assembly, and was reelected in 1952.

Scandal and later life
Lyon's political career ended in scandal when, in 1954, he was convicted in connection with a liquor license bribery scheme in Southern California. Lyon was convicted of grand theft and conspiracy to commit grand theft. Lyon was paroled on November 5, 1956, after serving 18 months of a 5-year sentence at San Luis Obispo's Men's Colony. In 1958, he was pardoned by Governor Goodwin Knight. He spent his final years as a lobbyist for the Southern California Merchants Association.

Lyon died of cancer in July 1960, in Beverly Hills, California. In December 1961, Governor Edmund G. "Pat" Brown pardoned Lyon's fellow conspirator, former Assembly Member Delbert Morris.

Charles W. Lyon is buried at Inglewood Park Cemetery.

References

External links
Join California Charles W. Lyon

1887 births
1960 deaths
Republican Party California state senators
Speakers of the California State Assembly
Republican Party members of the California State Assembly
Recipients of American gubernatorial pardons
20th-century American politicians